In Depths of Dreams Unconscious is an EP by the Swedish death/black metal group Crimson Moonlight, released in 2007 on Endtime Productions.

Recording
In Depths of Dreams Unconscious was recorded in Spring 2006  at Studio Underground, and the EP was produced by Pelle Saether and Crimson Moonlight. Before recording, the band announced that they would not continue co-operation with Rivel Records, and the recording was kept in secret until early Summer of 2006 when the Swedish label Endtime Productions announced the signing of Crimson Moonlight. The press release stated that Crimson Moonlight would tour US that Summer. For the tour, Endtime produced an unofficial limited edition pre-release of the EP. While performing in US, Crimson Moonlight sold 2 different versions on the EP: the first one included a 1-page cover picture of the crow in ochre color; the second one included only the CD with jewelcase, no booklet.

After the tour Endtime Productions announced the official black and white cover art for In Depths of Dreams Unconsciousin. Official release date was set by the label  for February 1, 2007. A so-called Art Folder Edition of the EP, limited to 50 copies, was released at the same time. In Depths of Dreams Unconscious artbook edition was a handmade edition that contained the CD in big black cardboard folder together with some concept photos. The official edition contains the band logo in a sticker attached to the jewelcase.

Overview
The official edition of In Depths of Dreams Unconscious includes the eponymous intro composed by Peter Bjärgö and the neoclassical group Arcana, a musical group signed to Cold Meat Industry label. The intro showcases influences of medieval music. 

The EP includes 2 new Crimson Moonlight songs, "The Advent of the Grim Hour" and "Shiver of Fear". Musically they continue the band's style heard on the previous 2005 album Veil of Remembrance, grindcore influenced death/black metal, but the songs are more melodic and at parts technical. The production improved the EP compared the previous releases.  Half of the vocals are guttural death growls, mostly performed by the bass player Johan Ylenstrand, contrasted by the black metal shrieking by Simon Rosén. The lyrics are more philosophical than before and deal with the essence of fear ("Shiver of Fear") and spiritual struggle ("The Advent of the Grim Hour").

"Alone in Silence" is a re-written version a song with the same title from Crimson Moonlight's first demo, Glorification of the Master of Light. It is an old school black metal song with a melodic undercurrent.

Track listing
"In Depths of Dreams Unconscious" - 02:20 
"The Advent of the Grim Hour" - 05:01 
"Shiver of Fear" - 04:43  
"Alone in Silence" - 02:25

Personnel 

Simon "Pilgrim" Rosén – vocals
Per Sundberg – guitar
Gustav "Gurra" Elowsson – drums
Johan Ylenstrand – bass, additional vocals
Erik Tordsson – guitar

References

Crimson Moonlight albums
2007 EPs